Dr Edward Rowland Alworth Merewether FRSE CB CBE (1892-1970) was a British barrister and physician (combining two fields in a unique manner). He was an expert in industrial medicine and the laws linked to this, working especially with asbestosis. In 1944 he was appointed Honorary Physician to King George VI. Close colleagues called him "Uncle M". In authorship he is known as E. R. A. Merewether.

Life
He was born in Durham on 2 March 1892 the son of Alworth Edward Merewether, a naval surgeon.

He studied Medicine at Durham University graduating MB BS in 1914. In the First World War he served in the Royal Navy. He received the Order of St Sava for his work in Serbia. After the war he started specialising in chest diseases.

In 1927 he joined the staff of the Factory Department of the Home Office. Here he was one of the first to identify the dangers of breathing asbestos fibre and also identified silicosis in sandblast operators. In 1928 he joined Dr H. E. Seiler, Medical Officer of Health in Glasgow looking at cases of pulmonary fibrosis in asbestos workers. Merewether conclusively proved a link between asbestos and the disease.

In 1940 he was elected a Fellow of the Royal Society of Edinburgh. His proposers were Sir Thomas Oliver, Stuart McDonald, Edwin Bramwell and David Murray Lyon.

In 1943 he succeeded Dr J. C. Bridge as His Majesty's Senior Inspector of Factories in Great Britain.

He retired in 1957 and died on 13 February 1970.

Family

His great grandfather was John Merewether.

In 1918 he married Ruth Annie Hayton Waddell. They had three daughters.

Publications

Report on the Effects of Asbestos Dust on Lungs (1930)
Industrial Medicine and Hygiene

References

1892 births
1970 deaths
People from Durham, England
20th-century British medical doctors
Fellows of the Royal Society of Edinburgh
Asbestos
Alumni of Durham University College of Medicine